Danilo Medaković (17 December 1819 – 5 November 1881) was a Serbian writer, journalist and publisher. One of Serbia's leading publicists, Medaković had his own printing press in Novi Sad where he published several periodicals, magazines, and three newspapers, both political and literary. Milorad Medaković, also a writer and publisher, was his younger brother.

Danilo Medaković received his education in the gymnasium of Zadar under teachers who inspired him with an enduring love of classical authors. He studied jurisprudence at the University of Vienna from 1838 to 1843, finishing his studies with the degree of Doctor of Roman Law. He then went to Humboldt University of Berlin where he studied history with Theodor Mommsen.

Printing and publishing 
An outstanding figure in the printing trade in the mid-nineteenth century, Danilo Medakovic was regarded as a shrewd businessman who managed to acquire the most lucrative of all patents, namely the Bible patent and associated liturgical texts and manuscripts. Born in 1819, Medaković was a wealthy man with powerful friends at court, for he was closely connected with the Obrenović family. He became interested in the printing trade and is first heard of as a publisher on 14 November 1848 when he launched the newspaper "Napredak," thanks to Jevrem Obrenović's support. Medaković was a retainer of Jevrem Obrenović, and through the influence of the brother of the Serbian prince, Medaković was able to secure a small place at the court of Prince Miloš Obrenović. Medaković formulated a scheme for the establishment of a Serbian printing house on the model of those in Rome, Turin, and Venice. As a publisher he had business connections with Serbs in the homeland and abroad, and in 1848 he settled in Belgrade, where he soon became a person of some importance, and consorted with Jovan Ilić, Bogoboj Atanacković, Ljubomir Nenadović, Milica Stojadinović Srpkinja, Josif Rajačić, Stanojlo Petrović, Prince Mihailo Obrenović, Milivoje Petrović Blaznavac, Petar II Petrović Njegoš. At the same time, he entered into political and literary work, publishing newspapers Napredak (Progress, 1848–1852), Srpski Dnevnik (Serbian Daily, 1852–1858), Sedmica (Weekly, 1852–1858), and almanacs Lasta and Godisnjak.

"Napredak" was the first newspaper in the country to be written in Vuk Karadžić's reformed Serbian. In 1849 he started on his career as a Bible printer, having obtained a privilege to print the St. Petersburg version of the Bible in Serbia. In 1849 he purchased extensive patent which included the Old and New Testament in Serbian, with or without notes, of any translation. The full patent granted to Medaković the office of royal printer of all statutes, books, bills, Acts of Parliament (Sabor), proclamations, injunctions, Bibles, and New Testaments, in the Serbian tongue of any translation, all service books to be used in churches, and all other volumes ordered to be printed by the Crown Prince or Sabor (Parliament).

Literary work 
Medaković began his career as a man of letters with Serbske-narodne vitezžke pjesme od Andrija Kačić Miošić (with a preface by Danilo Medaković), of which was issued in 1849. This work was published in Vuk's reformed Serbian and was received with much favor. His next book, "Poviestnica srbskog naroda od naistarii vremena do 1850" (Tales of the Serbian People from Ancient Times to 1850), in four volumes, published in 1851 and 1852, had all the qualities which were soon to make him famous, and its power was immediately recognized by some of the best critics of the day. Encouraged by the reception of "Poviestnica srbskog naroda vitezke pesme", he edited and published in rapid succession, ten works of Dositej Obradović, Đuro Daničić's translation of Andrej Muravjev's "Pisma o sluzvi božijoj u pravoslavnoj crkvi", Božidar Petranović's "Istorija književnosti," and almanacs Godisnjak and Lasta (after the dissolution of his newspaper "Napredak"). This series of books won Medaković an assured place in Serbian literature, and during the rest of his life, every work he produced or published was welcomed by a wide circle of admirers. His works are preserved in the library of the Serbian Academy of Arts and Sciences, of which he was a member.

St. Andrew Assembly 

A crucial event in the political life of Serbia and in political publicist writing as well as the St. Andrew's Assembly, which was held in Belgrade at the end of 1858. The battle of the bourgeoisie and liberal intelligentsia for constitutionality and parliamentarism started with it. After the Assembly two basic political streams were formed, the liberal and the conservative, which fought between themselves for influence among the people through the newspapers. Prince Miloš, who was already growing old, occasionally supported liberals and occasionally conservatives, to finally come to rely on the conservatives. It is important that both sides had a chance to present their ideas and program. The foundations of modern Serbian publicist writing were laid down in that short period(1859). The most eminent journalists were the writer Matija Ban, on the side of conservatives, and the politician Vladimir Jovanović, on the side of liberals. Danilo Medaković had to steer his newspapers between the two at times, not favoring one party over the other.

Medaković's business continued to thrive and from 1859 onwards he conducted it mainly through his deputies, Jovan Đorđević, who took over the management of the newspaper "Srpski dnevnik", and Platon Atanacković, who ran the printing and publishing end. Medaković managed to obtain a renewal of his exclusive patent with reversion for life to his son Bogdan. Father and son lived in Belgrade until 1862 when he returned to Novi Sad. Danilo Medaković also had a house at Zagreb to which he retired in 1878, and there he died ten years later (1888). Though at one point, he contemplated leaving Zagreb. Greatly disturbed by the situation in Croatia, particularly by the anti-Serbian mood, the aged Danilo Medaković, who had moved recently to Zagreb from Novi Sad to spend the rest of his days there, wrote to a friend on 28 February 1878:

"The rabid feelings against the Serbs which have reached such a pitch here have gotten on my nerves so much so that I myself am considering moving away from here" (cited in Đorđe Popović-Daničar, "Dr. Danilo Medaković", Otadzbina IX, No. 36, page 613).

Medaković and his deputies had supplied Serbia with about seventy editions of the Scriptures between 1859 and 1888 and they were accurate and well printed. With his brother and other associates, Medaković established three Serbian newspapers -- "Napredak" (Progress), "Vestnik" (News), and "Pozornik" (Sentinel) -- that played a major role in disseminating information to the Serbs in their homeland and abroad during the maelstrom of the 1848 Revolution in Austria.

The revolutionary wave which spread over Europe in 1848 had a great influence on the development of Serbian journalism, especially in Vojvodina. After the fall of Metternich's absolutism and the suspension of censorship in the Austrian monarchy, the national question became a leading theme of the Serbian press. Political editorials and reports of correspondents prevailed in the newspapers instead of professional articles in installments. The best representative of this new brand of journalism was the newspaper "Napredak" ("The Progress"), which was being published during the March revolution, in Sremski Karlovci, and in Zemun. Its Publisher and Editor-In-Chief was Danilo Medaković, who got his doctoral degree in philosophy in Berlin and was a collaborator on several European newspapers. According to Jovan Skerlić, the first historian of Serbian press, "Napredak" ("Progress") was a "decisively national newspaper", which occasionally supported progressive European ideas.

Danilo Medaković was the first journalist in Vojvodina of whom it might be said that he managed to get some material success. At the March Revolution, he started to issue at Sremski Karlovci the newspaper "Napredak", which was immediately established among the people—it was bringing news obviously interesting to the broad masses. "Napredak" was supported by the pen and intellectual strength of Danilo Medaković and Djordje Popović-Daničar. The conception of the paper was not a firm one, it often vacillated and shared the fate of the different views of its editors, who in editing the paper and determining its trend, followed a wide variety of paths, not necessarily to the detriment of the paper. A literary, informative and general interest bi-weekly, "Juzna Pcela", however, published and edited by Milorad Medaković, Danilo's brother, filled the void left by the short-lived "Vojvodjanka" in Zemun in 1851. It wrote about all matters of interest to the Serbs, ranging from internal political affairs in Serbia and Montenegro, social and political position of the Christians in Turkey, especially in Bosnia, to Serbo-Hungarian relations. It denounced the 1848 Hungarian emigres. Milorad Medaković, who knew Petar II Petrović-Njegoš closely during the last few years of the latter's reign, wrote a biography of the famed poet entitled "P.P. Njegoš, posljednji vladajuci vladika crnokorski" (P. P. Njegoš, the Last Ruling Prince-Bishop of Montenegro, published in Novi Sad in 1882), and many other books.

Danilo Medaković supported Stefan Stratimirović's policy, and his paper "Napredak" concluded that just as "there has never been liberty in Austria," so now "there never will be," because Austria and liberty "are perpetual enemies." That turning point came about after the 1848 Revolution when the Austrian government reneged on its promises and began to suppress all the Serbian institutions in the Empire.

He was among the many followers of Vuk Karadžić's reforms. He supported Karadžić's principle that the native language is the people's most precious wealth and the manifestation of people's worth.

His son Bogdan Medaković was a Serbian lawyer and representative in the Croatian Sabor in Austria-Hungary, and grandson Dejan Medaković, a Serbian writer, historian, and scholar.

His chief work 
 "Poviestnica srbskog naroda od naistarii vremena do 1850," in four volumes, published in Novi Sad in 1851 and 1852.
 An urban neighbourhood in Belgrade, Serbia, is called Medaković.

References 
 Jovan Skerlić, Istorija nove srpske književnosti (Belgrade, 1914, 1921), pages 203 and 204
 Serbian Academy of Sciences and Arts: http://www.sanu.ac.rs/English/Clanstvo/IstClan.aspx?arg=324,

Serbian writers
1819 births
1881 deaths